The Academy of Aerospace Solid Propulsion Technology or AASPT (in Chinese: 航天动力技术研究院), also known as "The Fourth Academy", is a conglomerate of Chinese state-owned enterprises that develops rocket engines that use solid fuel. The group, which employs around 10,000 people, includes some ten entities located in the Shaanxi and Hubei regions, and is headquartered in Xi'an. AASPT is a subsidiary of the China Aerospace Science and Technology Corporation (CASC).

Activity 
AASPT is China's leading solid fuel propulsion specialist. In particular, it develops DF-31 ground-to-ground ballistic missiles, JL-2 sea-to-ground ballistic missiles, apogee engines for geostationary telecommunications satellites, and China's new Long March 11 light launcher. AASPT employs some 4,000 researchers and senior technicians, and comprises five research institutes, three factories and five subsidiaries. Its total revenue was 5.4 billion yuan in 2014.

See also 
 Chinese space program
 China Aerospace Science and Technology Corporation (CASC)
 Academy of Aerospace Liquid Propulsion Technology (AALPT)

References

External links 
 Official website 

Aerospace companies
Research institutes in China
Space program of the People's Republic of China
China, PR